Saint Maxentius ( –) was born in Agde, France, and originally had the name Adjutor.  He was trained by Saint Severus and became a monk in his abbey.

Butler's Lives of the Saints offers the following remarks:

Praise was even more distasteful to him than detraction, and to escape the prominence into which he was being thrust, he quietly slipped away from Agde and remained in hiding for two years. But when at the end of that time he came back to his home he found himself in a position of far greater publicity....Obviously, he must sever all ties with the past if he was to lead a life of obscurity. A second time he disappeared and this time he abandoned his native Narbonnaise for good.

He joined the monastery at Poitou and took the name Maxentius.  In about 500 he was elected abbot, succeeding Abbot Agapitus.  In old age he retired from the office of abbot and became a hermit.

Maxentius is credited with several miracles. His return to Agde after his initial absence coincided with a break in the weather, relieving the drought-stricken countryside. During his tenure as abbot he confronted a band of soldiers who were threatening the monastery. One of the soldiers raised his arm to strike Maxentius but found himself unable to do so. The arm remained frozen until Maxentius applied holy oil.

His feast day is June 26.

References

6th-century Christian saints
440s births

510s deaths
Year of birth uncertain
Year of death uncertain